Alexander Edwards VC (4 November 1885 – 24 March 1918) was a Scottish recipient of the Victoria Cross, the highest and most prestigious award for valour in the face of the enemy that can be awarded to British and Commonwealth forces.

Life
Edwards was born in Stotfield, Lossiemouth, Morayshire, the son of a fisherman, and became a cooper working in the herring fishery.

On 1 September 1914 he joined the 6th (Morayshire) Battalion, the Seaforth Highlanders, a part of the 51st (Highland) Division. After training in Bedford, the battalion travelled to France in May 1915.

VC action
Edwards, now a sergeant, demonstrated tremendous bravery and was awarded the Victoria Cross for his actions at the Battle of Pilckem Ridge on 31 July 1917 on the first day of the Battle of Passchendaele.

The London Gazette of 14 September 1917 recorded:

Returning to Britain, Edwards received his Victoria Cross from King George V at Buckingham Palace on 26 September 1917. A week later he attended a reception in his honour at Lossiemouth, where he was presented with a gold watch and war bonds. He later returned to France and rejoined the 6th Seaforth.

Killed in action
On 21 March 1918 the Germans began their Kaiserschlacht (Spring Offensive). On 24 March Edwards was wounded and posted missing in action, presumed killed, at Bapaume Wood, east of Arras, France.

No body was ever identified, and Serjeant Edwards is commemorated at Bay 8 on the Arras Memorial.

The Moray Firth Golf Links at Lossiemouth have a sundial memorial to Edwards and his cousin, Captain G.E. Edwards , who also died while serving with the 6th Seaforth during the war. As boys, both had acted as Caddies at the golf course.

The medal
His Victoria Cross is displayed at The Highlanders Museum in Fort George, Inverness-shire, Scotland.

References

Further reading
Monuments to Courage (David Harvey, 1999)
The Register of the Victoria Cross (This England, 1997)
Scotland's Forgotten Valour (Graham Ross, 1995)
VCs of the First World War - Passchendaele 1917 (Stephen Snelling, 1998)

External links
 Commonwealth War Graves Commission

British World War I recipients of the Victoria Cross
British military personnel killed in World War I
British Army personnel of World War I
Seaforth Highlanders soldiers
1885 births
1918 deaths
People from Lossiemouth
British Army recipients of the Victoria Cross